Senirusi Seruvakula (born 12 November 1969) is a Fijian rugby union coach. He is currently the Head Coach of the Fiji women's national rugby union team.

Rugby career 
Seruvakula played for the Brothers Rugby Club in Brisbane for seven years. He made only one international appearance for Fiji in 2002 against Samoa. He spent four years with Hong Kong’s Tigers, and had a stint with Châteauneuf-du-Pape in France's Fédérale 1 competition.

Coaching 
Seruvakula coached the Fijian Drua from 2017 to 2019. He led them to win the 2018 National Rugby Championship. He has also coached the Fijian Latui in the Global Rapid Rugby competition, and the Fiji Warriors.

Seruvakula was appointed as Head Coach of the Fiji women's national rugby union team in 2020. In 2022, He led the Fijiana Drua to win the Super W title in only their first year of competition.

References 

1969 births
Living people
Fijian rugby union coaches
Fiji women's national rugby union team coaches